"The Best of Times" is a song by American rock band Styx, released as the first single from their tenth album Paradise Theatre. It reached No. 1 in Canada on the RPM national singles chart, their second chart-topper in that country, and No. 3 on the US Billboard Hot 100 for four weeks in March and April 1981. In the UK, the song peaked at No. 42 on the UK Singles Chart.

Despite the song's success, the song has not been performed live by the band since singer Dennis DeYoung was dismissed in 1999. DeYoung, however, still performs the song regularly on his solo tours.

Lyrics and music
The title "The Best of Times" is somewhat ironic since the lyrics often state that these are the worst of times.  But the singer says that he can get consolation, since the chorus states "The best of times are when I’m alone with you.” 

Allmusic critic Eduardo Rivadavia described the song as having a "deliberate, marching rhythm."  The basic melody line for "The Best of Times" is used in two other places on the album:  As a bold greeting to the listener in "A.D. 1928", and a softer, more subdued version for the farewell track, "A.D. 1958".

DeYoung wrote "The Best of Times" to be the centerpiece of the Paradise Theater album, whose theme was inspired by the 1980 United States presidential election between Ronald Reagan and Jimmy Carter and the fear that Americans were feeling at the time. Snippets of the melody are heard at the beginning and end of the album.

DeYoung said of writing the song:

DeYoung said of Tommy Shaw's guitar solo:

Reception
Record World said that the song illustrates DeYoung's growth as a singer and songwriter and that "A triumphant chorus hook proclamation is hitbound."

Rivadavia called "The Best of Times" "one of the more improbable Top Ten hits of the decade," adding that "somehow it just works."

Personnel
Dennis DeYoung - lead vocals, keyboards
Tommy Shaw - lead guitar, vocoder, backing vocals
James Young - rhythm guitar, backing vocals
Chuck Panozzo - bass
John Panozzo - drums

Charts

Weekly charts

Year-end charts

References

Styx (band) songs
1980 songs
1981 singles
Songs written by Dennis DeYoung
A&M Records singles
RPM Top Singles number-one singles
Rock ballads